Kelly Kaplan (née George; born September 10, 1982) is a social media, public relations and communication professional, and former officer in the United States Air Force, and a beauty queen from Mission Viejo, California, who competed for the Miss USA title in 2007.

Biography 
George grew up in Mission Viejo, California, and attended Trabuco Hills High School.  She later gained a BA in communications from University of Maryland, College Park, in part paid for by the $25,000 she earned in scholarship money by competing in pageants. She had placed third runner-up at Miss Maryland 2004 pageant and second runner-up in 2005.  While at the University of Maryland she joined the university's Air Force Reserve Officer Training Corps programme.  She was later commissioned as a second lieutenant.

She then moved to Arkansas where she studied for her master's degree at University of Arkansas, Little Rock. She has worked as an intern at the press desk of the Office of the Secretary of Defense at The Pentagon and as deputy chief of Public Affairs for the 314th Airlift Wing at Little Rock Air Force Base.

While stationed in Arkansas she won the Miss Arkansas USA 2007 title in the state pageant held in Conway, Arkansas. A resident of Sherwood, she was presented with the key to the city.

George competed in the Miss USA 2007 pageant, which was broadcast live from the Kodak Theatre in Los Angeles, California, on March 23, 2007. She was the first active-duty military member to compete in the pageant in its 56-year history.

George is a former morning/noon news anchor for KNWA in Fayetteville, Arkansas. She also was featured on "Arkansas at Noon" a combination newscast on KARK where both Little Rock and Fayetteville participate. KNWA and KARK are sister NBC affiliate stations. She then moved to Houston where she worked for the Houston Astros as Director of Social Media and currently works as a spokeswoman for Boeing.

References

External links
Personal website
Miss Arkansas USA official website
Miss USA official website

1982 births
Living people
Boeing people
Miss USA 2007 delegates
People from Sherwood, Arkansas
Women in the United States Air Force
United States Air Force officers
University of Maryland, College Park alumni
American television news anchors
Television anchors from Houston